Egyházasdengeleg is a village in Nógrád County, Hungary with 464 inhabitants (2015).

References 

Populated places in Nógrád County